Shangri La is the second studio album by English indie rock artist Jake Bugg. The album was produced by Rick Rubin and named after his studio in Malibu, California, where recording took place in the summer of 2013. The album was released on 18 November 2013 and was met with mixed reactions from fans and critics.

Release
The first single "What Doesn't Kill You" was announced and released from Shangri La on 23 September 2013. On 17 October 2013, "Slumville Sunrise" was revealed as the second single from the album, and a video promoting the song and album was released.
Two more singles, "A Song About Love" and "Me and You" were released in early 2014. However these singles, and indeed all the singles from this album, failed commercially compared to the singles from his previous album, none reaching the UK Top 40. 
The album was originally scheduled for release in the United States on 14 January 2014, by Island Records, with a five-song EP released on 18 November 2013. However, following a "sold-out" tour in the United States, the release was rescheduled to 19 November 2013, a day after the UK release.

Critical reception

The album received mixed reviews from critics. Barry Nicolson from the NME gave the album a 6/10 review and said "By rush-releasing ‘Shangri La’, Bugg manages to circumvent some second album pratfalls, although he's succumbed to the most obvious one – it's not as good as his first." The Guardian also gave a negative review, giving the album 2 stars and remarking that "his new album is pretty run of the mill".

However at Metacritic, which assigns a normalised rating out of 100 to reviews from mainstream critics, the album received an average score of 66 (based on 15 reviews) indicating the reception of the album has been 'generally favourable'.

Track listing

Bonus tracks
 "Strange Creatures" (Free download from Amazon.de)
 "A Change in the Air" (Extra track from Japanese release of the album)

Personnel
 Jake Bugg – lead vocals, lead guitar, acoustic guitar, slide guitar, piano
 Jason Lader – bass guitar
 Matt Sweeney – rhythm guitar
Pete Thomas - drums
Chad Smith - drums

Charts and certifications

Weekly charts

Year-end charts

Certifications

|}

References

2013 albums
Albums produced by Rick Rubin
Island Records albums
Jake Bugg albums
Mercury Records albums
Albums recorded at Shangri-La (recording studio)